Tom Petty and the Heartbreakers is the debut album by the band of the same name, released on November 9, 1976, by Shelter Records. The album was recorded and mixed at the Shelter Studio in Hollywood, California.

Release and promotion 
Initially following its release, the album received little attention in the United States. Following a British tour, it climbed to No. 24 on the UK albums chart and the single "Anything That's Rock 'n' Roll" became a hit in the UK. After nearly a year and many positive reviews, the album reached the U.S. charts, where it peaked at No. 55 in 1978 and eventually went Gold.

"Breakdown" was released as the lead single and cracked the Top 40 in the U.S. and "American Girl" became one of the band's signature songs.

Critical reception 
Reviewing in Christgau's Record Guide: Rock Albums of the Seventies (1981), Robert Christgau said, "Addicts of updated nostalgia and rock and roll readymades should find this a sly and authentic commentary on the evolving dilemma of Harold Teen. The songs are cute, the riffs executed with more dynamism than usual, and the singing attractively phlegmy. And like they say at the end of other cartoons, that's all, folks." The album was included in the book 1001 Albums You Must Hear Before You Die.

Track listing

Charts

Personnel 
Tom Petty and the Heartbreakers
 Tom Petty – vocals, electric guitar, acoustic guitar, Hammond organ on track 9
 Mike Campbell – electric guitar, acoustic guitar
 Benmont Tench – piano, Hammond organ, synthesizer
 Ron Blair – bass guitar on tracks 1–2, 4–5, 7–10, cello on track 4
 Stan Lynch – drums on tracks 1–2, 4–5, 7–10, synthesizer on track 9

Additional musicians

 Jeff Jourard – electric guitar on tracks 2, 6–8
 Donald "Duck" Dunn – bass guitar on track 3
 Emory Gordy – bass guitar on track 6
 Randall Marsh – drums on track 3
 Jim Gordon – drums on track 6
 Noah Shark – maracas, tambourine, sleigh bells
 Charlie Souza – saxophone on track 3
 Phil Seymour – backing vocals on tracks 2, 10
 Dwight Twilley – backing vocals on track 6

References

External links
 Lyrics
 Official Website

Tom Petty albums
1976 debut albums
Albums produced by Denny Cordell
Shelter Records albums